Rain Drop Splash is a 1946 picture book by Alvin Tresselt and illustrated by Leonard Weisgard. The story follows a raindrop that becomes part of ever-larger bodies of water. The book was a recipient of a 1947 Caldecott Honor for its illustrations and Weisgard became the first illustrator to receive the Caldecott Medal and Honor in the same year.

References

1946 children's books
American picture books
Caldecott Honor-winning works